Territorial pick may refer to:

KHL territorial pick
NBA territorial pick